Yvoire is a small medieval town in the department of Haute-Savoie, in the southeastern French region of Auvergne-Rhône-Alpes. It is located 24 kilometers (14.9 miles) northeast of Geneva.

Geography
Located at the tip of the Leman peninsula (presqu'île de Léman), Yvoire delimits the two main parts of Lake Geneva, the "petit lac" and the "grand lac".

Features
The town is well known for its medieval buildings and summer floral displays, as well as the Jardin des Cinq Sens, a garden in the center of the town. It is called one of the "most beautiful villages of France".

History

The town was fortified by Amadeus V in the 14th century. It soon gained a strategic military importance and the inhabitants were given tax privileges.

Population

See also
Communes of the Haute-Savoie department

References

External links

 Yvoire tourism website

Communes of Haute-Savoie
Plus Beaux Villages de France
Populated places on Lake Geneva